The 1946 Tasmanian Australian National Football League (TANFL) premiership season was an Australian Rules football competition staged in Hobart, Tasmania over fifteen roster rounds and three finals series matches between 4 May and 28 September 1946.

Participating clubs
Hobart Football Club
New Town District Football Club
North Hobart Football Club
Sandy Bay Football Club

1946 TANFL Club Coaches
Noel Gray Sr & Ron Savage (Hobart)
Brian Kelly (New Town)
Arthur O'Brien & Dinny Kelleher (North Hobart)
Lance Collins (Sandy Bay)

TANFL Reserves Grand Final
New Town 7.10 (52) v Sandy Bay 5.2 (32) – North Hobart Oval

TANFL Under-19's Grand Final
State Schools Old Boys Football Association (SSOBFA)
 Buckingham 5.5 (35) v South East 2.4 (16) – New Town Oval

State Grand Final
(Saturday, 5 October 1946)
Sandy Bay: 3.6 (24) | 5.7 (37) | 11.9 (75) | 13.13 (91)
Nth Launceston: 2.1 (13) | 6.8 (44) | 10.9 (69) | 12.13 (85)
Attendance: 7,852 at North Hobart Oval

Intrastate Matches
Jubilee Shield (Saturday, 8 June 1946)
TANFL 15.14 (104) v NWFU 13.13 (91) – Att: 6,200 at North Hobart Oval

Jubilee Shield (Saturday, 29 June 1946)
 NTFA 14.9 (93) v TANFL 12.11 (83) – Att: 9,700 at York Park

Jubilee Shield (Saturday, 20 July 1946)
TANFL 17.12 (114) v NTFA 8.3 (51) – Att: 9,420 at North Hobart Oval

Jubilee Shield (Saturday, 10 August 1946)
TANFL 15.22 (112) v NWFU 13.21 (99) – Att: 7,500 at West Park Oval

Inter-Association Match (Saturday, 29 June 1946)
TANFL 16.19 (115) v Huon FA 14.15 (99) – Att: 700 at Franklin Football Ground

Inter-Association Match (Saturday, 10 August 1946)
TANFL 15.13 (103) v Huon FA 10.16 (76) – Att: 2,500 at North Hobart Oval

Leading Goalkickers: TANFL
Alf Cook (New Town) – 58

Medal winners
Ernie Pilkington (Sandy Bay) – William Leitch Medal
Alan Hughes (Macalburn) – V.A Geard Medal (Under-19's)

1946 TANFL Ladder

Round 1
(Saturday, 4 May 1946)
Nth Hobart 11.13 (79) v New Town 10.13 (73) – Att: 3,400 at North Hobart Oval
Sandy Bay 14.18 (102) v Hobart 5.5 (35) – Att: 1,120 at Queenborough Oval

Round 2
(Saturday, 11 May 1946)
Nth Hobart 13.17 (95) v Hobart 14.8 (92) – Att: 1,800 at North Hobart Oval
New Town 17.19 (121) v Sandy Bay 15.11 (101) – Att: 3,300 at TCA Ground

Round 3
(Saturday, 18 May 1946)
New Town 15.22 (112) v Hobart 6.15 (51) – Att: 1,060 at North Hobart Oval
Sandy Bay 15.10 (100) v Nth Hobart 10.12 (72) – Att: 1,085 at TCA Ground

Round 4
(Saturday, 25 May 1946)
Nth Hobart 14.22 (106) v New Town 13.10 (88)  – Att: 3,250 at North Hobart Oval
Sandy Bay 19.13 (127) v Hobart 11.21 (87) – Att: 1,200 at TCA Ground

Round 5
(Saturday, 1 June 1946)
New Town 11.20 (86) v Sandy Bay 12.5 (77) – Att: 3,900 at North Hobart Oval
Hobart 12.14 (86) v Nth Hobart 10.16 (76) – Att: 1,100 at TCA Ground *

Round 6
(Monday, 10 June 1946)
Nth Hobart 16.21 (117) v Sandy Bay 14.20 (104) – Att: 4,830 at North Hobart Oval
New Town 21.19 (145) v Hobart 12.14 (86) – Att: 1,690 at TCA Ground

Round 7
(Saturday, 15 June & Monday, 17 June 1946)
Nth Hobart 4.12 (36) v New Town 4.12 (36) – Att: 5,970 at North Hobart Oval
Sandy Bay 14.18 (102) v Hobart 11.11 (77) – Att: 3,622 at North Hobart Oval (Monday)

Round 8
(Saturday, 22 June 1946)
Sandy Bay 13.15 (93) v New Town 12.13 (85) – Att: 3,500 at North Hobart Oval
Nth Hobart 12.19 (91) v Hobart 8.7 (55) – Att: 1,247 at TCA Ground

Round 9
(Saturday, 6 July 1946)
Hobart 17.13 (115) v New Town 12.9 (81) – Att: 1,290 at North Hobart Oval
Sandy Bay 7.17 (59) v Nth Hobart 7.7 (49) – Att: 2,210 at TCA Ground

Round 10
(Saturday, 13 July 1946)
New Town 9.16 (70) v Nth Hobart 6.12 (48) – Att: 2,290 at North Hobart Oval
Sandy Bay 21.16 (142) v Hobart 7.10 (52) – Att: 1,060 at TCA Ground

Round 11
(Saturday, 27 July 1946)
New Town 15.13 (103) v Sandy Bay 15.13 (103) – Att: 5,000 at North Hobart Oval
Nth Hobart 15.16 (106) v Hobart 8.10 (58) – Att: 608 at TCA Ground

Round 12
(Saturday, 3 August 1946)
Nth Hobart 8.11 (59) v Sandy Bay 7.12 (54) – Att: 4,610 at North Hobart Oval
New Town 16.21 (117) v Hobart 7.13 (55) – Att: 475 at TCA Ground

Round 13
(Saturday, 17 August 1946)
Sandy Bay 16.6 (102) v Hobart 9.5 (59) – Att: 906 at North Hobart Oval
New Town 13.11 (89) v Nth Hobart 11.6 (72) – Att: 3,550 at TCA Ground

Round 14
(Saturday, 31 August 1946)
Nth Hobart 9.14 (68) v Hobart 5.7 (37) – Att: 1,010 at North Hobart Oval
New Town 13.13 (91) v Sandy Bay 8.8 (56) – Att: 5,200 at TCA Ground

Round 15
(Saturday, 7 September 1946)
Nth Hobart 12.7 (79) v Sandy Bay 7.11 (53) – Att: 4,000 at North Hobart Oval
New Town 25.15 (165) v Hobart 6.10 (46) – Att: 688 at TCA Ground *

Semi-final
(Saturday, 14 September 1946)
Sandy Bay: 1.3 (9) | 6.9 (45) | 9.14 (68) | 12.18 (90)
Nth Hobart: 4.2 (26) | 4.5 (29) | 7.10 (52) | 10.13 (73)
Attendance: 6,900 at North Hobart Oval

Preliminary Final
(Saturday, 21 September 1946)
Sandy Bay: 1.7 (13) | 6.9 (45) | 10.14 (74) | 17.19 (121)
New Town: 1.4 (10) | 5.8 (38) | 11.13 (79) | 15.19 (109)
Attendance: 9,400 at North Hobart Oval

Grand Final
(Saturday, 28 September 1946)
Sandy Bay: 1.3 (9) | 4.9 (33) | 7.10 (52) | 12.16 (88)
New Town: 1.4 (10) | 1.10 (16) | 4.16 (40) | 5.16 (46)
Attendance: 12,500 at North Hobart Oval

Source: All scores and statistics courtesy of the Hobart Mercury publications.

Tasmanian Football League seasons